Icke is a name and it may refer to:

Surname 
David Icke (born 1952), English conspiracy theorist
Robert Icke, English writer and director
Laurie Icke (1929–2010), Australian rules footballer
Steven Icke (born 1956), Australian rules footballer
, Dutch cosmologist and theoretical astrophysicist after whom the asteroid 7508 Icke was named

Nickname 
Thomas "Icke" Häßler (b. 1966), German football player

See also 
 Ickes
 Ike (disambiguation)
 Eich (surname)